Leslie Byron Dunner (born January 5, 1956) is an American composer, conductor, clarinetist, and college professor. He was born in New York City and attended the University of Rochester Eastman School of Music, graduating in 1978 with a B.A. degree.  He received an M.A. degree in music theory and musicology from Queens College in 1979 and a D.M.A. in orchestral conducting from the University of Cincinnati in 1982. From 1982-1986 he served as Assistant Professor and Director of Instrumental Music at Carleton College in Northfield, Minnesota.

Dunner's first appointment as music director was with the Symphony Nova Scotia in 1996. He remained with that orchestra for three seasons.

In 1998, while still in his second year as music director of Symphony Nova Scotia, Dunner took up the post of music director of the Annapolis Symphony Orchestra.

References

External links
 Leslie B. Dunner, D.M.A
 Leslie Dunner conducts Symphony Silicon Valley
 2013 Festival De Mayo - Jalisco Symphony Orchestra

African-American classical composers
American classical composers
African-American conductors (music)
African-American male classical composers
American male conductors (music)
Orchestra leaders
Musicians from New York City
Living people
American male classical composers
Classical musicians from New York (state)
21st-century American conductors (music)
21st-century American male musicians
21st-century African-American musicians
20th-century African-American people
Year of birth missing (living people)